The dusky sergeant (Abudefduf concolor), also known as the night sergeant, is a species of damselfish in the family Pomacentridae endemic to the eastern Pacific Ocean. The species can reach 19 cm (7.5 inches) in total length.

Geographic distribution
Abudefduf concolor is found in the Eastern Pacific, from El Salvador to Peru, including the Galapagos, Cocos and Malpelo Islands.

Ecology
Abudefduf concolor is a marine species found in shallow reef habitats, primarily rocky inshore reefs, at depths of up to 5 m (16 ft). It is an omnivorous fish that is also oviparous, with individuals forming pairs during breeding and males guarding and aerating eggs.

References

dusky sergeant
Fish of Mexican Pacific coast
Western Central American coastal fauna
Galápagos Islands coastal fauna
dusky sergeant